Trinity Church, also known as Trinity Episcopal Church, is an historic Episcopal church in Warsaw, Wyoming County, New York.  The Carpenter Gothic style frame church was built in 1853-1854 and closely follows the plan and elevations of a country church published by Richard Upjohn (1802–1878) in his book Upjohn's Rural Architecture (1852). Upjohn's connection with the design of the church has been confirmed by a letter dated December 30, 1853.

It was listed on the National Register of Historic Places in 1980.

Due to years of deterioration, the steeple was removed in 2016.

References

External links
Welcome to Trinity Episcopal Church in Warsaw, NY website
Trinity Church - Warsaw, New York - U.S. National Register of Historic Places on Waymarking.com

Churches on the National Register of Historic Places in New York (state)
Episcopal church buildings in New York (state)
Carpenter Gothic church buildings in New York (state)
Churches completed in 1853
19th-century Episcopal church buildings
Churches in Wyoming County, New York
National Register of Historic Places in Wyoming County, New York